Colomer is a Spanish surname. Notable people with the surname include:

André Colomer (1886–1931), French poet and anarchist
Dámaso Ruiz-Jarabo Colomer (1949–2009), Spanish judge
Edmon Colomer, Spanish conductor
Eduardo Comín Colomer (1908–1975), Spanish writer and journalist
Jordi Colomer (born 1962), Spanish artist
José Colomer (1935–2013), Spanish field hockey player
Josep Colomer, Spanish political scientist
Juan J. Colomer (born 1966), Spanish composer
Maria Josep Colomer i Luque (1913–2004), Catalan-Spanish pioneer female pilot
Narciso Pascual Colomer (1808–1870), Spanish architect
Raúl Martínez Colomer, Puerto Rican swimmer

Spanish-language surnames
Catalan-language surnames